First Baptist Church was a historic African-American Baptist church located in High Point, Guilford County, North Carolina.  The Late Gothic Revival style brick church was built in 1907. It was significantly remodeled, enlarged, and a new facade added in the early-1950s.  The church was slated for demolition in September 2013 and was demolished in September 2015.

It was listed on the National Register of Historic Places in 2009.

References

African-American history of North Carolina
Baptist churches in North Carolina
Churches in High Point, North Carolina
Churches on the National Register of Historic Places in North Carolina
Gothic Revival church buildings in North Carolina
Churches completed in 1907
National Register of Historic Places in Guilford County, North Carolina
Demolished buildings and structures in North Carolina
Buildings and structures demolished in 2015